Petermann Ranges refers to:

Petermann Ranges (Antarctica), a mountain range in Queen Maud Land
Petermann Ranges (Australia), a heavily eroded mountain range in central Australia